The V. O. Hammon Publishing Company was a Chicago-based manufacturer of postcards from the Great Lakes region in the early 20th century. As of 1915, the company would buy only postcard rights to negatives from photographers.

Gallery

External links
 Gallery of V. O. Hammon cards

References

Publishing companies of the United States
Postcard publishers